Hornby High School is a state coeducational secondary school located in the western Christchurch, New Zealand suburb of Hornby. It caters for approximately  students from Years 7 to 13 (ages 10 to 18).

History
The school opened in February 1975 to serve the growing Hornby area. The permanent classroom blocks were supposed to be ready for the first intake of 240 Form 3 (now Year 9) students, but delays within the Treasury and Ministry of Works saw the completion date pushed back to early 1976. As a temporary solution, the Canterbury Education Board constructed twelve CEBUS relocatable classroom blocks at the eastern end of the school site. Most of the CEBUS classrooms are still present at the school, alongside the permanent S68 classroom blocks typical of 1970s-built New Zealand state secondary schools.

Originally a Year 9 to 13 secondary school, the school added Years 7 and 8 in January 2014 following the closure of nearby Branston Intermediate School

Notes

References

External links
 Hornby High School profile provided by newzealandeducated.com
Education Review Office (ERO) reports

Secondary schools in Christchurch
Educational institutions established in 1975
1975 establishments in New Zealand
New Zealand secondary schools of S68 plan construction